Ohtsuro Dam is a gravity dam located in Fukui Prefecture in Japan. The dam is used for flood control and water supply. The catchment area of the dam is 1.6 km2. The dam impounds about 3  ha of land when full and can store 485 thousand cubic meters of water. The construction of the dam was started on 1989 and completed in 2011.

References

Dams in Fukui Prefecture
2011 establishments in Japan